Hwang Seok-jeong (born February 2, 1971) is a South Korean actress. She has mostly played supporting roles in films and television series, notably Secret Love (2013), Misaeng: Incomplete Life (2014) and She Was Pretty (2015).

Filmography

Film

Television series

Variety show

Musical theatre

Awards and nominations

References

External links 
 
 
 
 
 

1971 births
Living people
21st-century South Korean actresses
South Korean television actresses
South Korean film actresses
South Korean television personalities
South Korean web series actresses
Seoul National University alumni